Ragnar Heurlin (6 August 1928 – 3 February 2013) was a Swedish sprint canoer who competed in the mid to late 1950s. He won two medals at the 1954 ICF Canoe Sprint World Championships in Mâcon with a gold in the K-4 10000 m and a silver in the K-4 1000 m events.

Heurlin also competed in the K-2 1000 m event at the 1956 Summer Olympics in Melbourne, but was eliminated in the heats and did not advance to the final.

References

Ragnar Heurlin's profile at Sports Reference.com
Ragnar Heurlin's profile at the Swedish Olympic Committee 

1928 births
2013 deaths
Canoeists at the 1956 Summer Olympics
Olympic canoeists of Sweden
Swedish male canoeists
ICF Canoe Sprint World Championships medalists in kayak